Gonzalo II Fernández de Córdoba (Cartagena, 27 July 1520 – 3 December 1578 in Odón),  third Duke of Sessa,  was the grandson of a Viceroy of Naples, Gonzalo Fernández de Córdoba, first duke of Sessa, the son of the first duke's daughter, Elvira Fernández de Córdoba y Manrique, and of her husband, Luis Fernández de Córdoba.
Gonzalo II, holder of several dukedoms and many other lesser titles, Spanish and Italian, was Captain General of the Spanish Troops in Italy, Great Admiral of the Kingdom of Naples, and a member of the Spanish king Royal Council for Italy and the Royal War Council.

His mother died in childbed in 1524, when he was four, and his father on campaign in Italy on 17 August 1526, when he was six. 
On 30 November 1538 he married at Valladolid, Spain,  María Sarmiento de Mendoza, the sister of Diego de los Cobos y Hurtado de Mendoza, 1st Marquess of Camarasa, and the daughter of Úbeda-born Francisco de los Cobos, powerful Secretary of State and Financial Accountant of King  Charles I of Spain, who was also Holy Roman Emperor,  Charles V. 
There was no issue  from this marriage.

He was twice a Governor of the Duchy of Milan, 1554–1560, Knight 213 of the Order of the Golden Fleece in 1555.
The lordship of Baena he had inherited from his father was converted to a dukedom  by King Philip II of Spain on 19 August 1566, making Gonzalo the 1st Duke of Baena.
In 1552 he sold his title of 3rd Duke of Andria to Fabrizio Carafa, count of Ruvo.

In 1578, he died without issue. The succession to many of his titles, including the 4th dukedom of Sessa, 6th title of Countess of Cabra and the 2nd dukedom of Baena went to  his youngest sister, who had described herself until then as Francisca Fernández de Córdoba. 

Francisca in 1542   had married Álvaro de Zúñiga y Sotomayor, 4th marquis of Gibraleón, 6th count of  Belalcázar (died 24 February 1559). This name Zúñiga belonged to her husband's mother, "Teresa de Zúñiga", who died  25 November 1565, 2nd marchioness of Ayamonte, Lady of Lepe and Redondela, 3rd duchess of Béjar on her own rights, 4th countess of Bañares, 2nd marchioness of Gibraleón. Her husband, a "Sotomayor", from Córdoba, was also a member of the nobility but not as wealthy or as important as his wife. Once more, the inherited name was not necessarily always "transmitted" by the father exclusively, things depending on personal circumstances. 
Francisca died without issue too, in 1597, and her ducal titles passed to her nephew, the son of her sister Beatriz, Antonio Fernández de Córdoba y Cardona (1550–1606).

External links
http://www.grandesp.org.uk/historia/gzas/cabra.htm
https://web.archive.org/web/20110722030656/http://www.comunecaraffadelbianco.it/public/index.php?option=com_content&view=article&id=26&Itemid=1&lang=en

1520 births
1578 deaths
Governors of the Duchy of Milan
Dukes of Spain
Knights of the Golden Fleece
16th-century Spanish people
Politicians from Cartagena, Spain